Juan Soldevilla y Romero (29 October 1843 – 4 June 1923) was a Spanish Cardinal of the Roman Catholic Church who served as Archbishop of Zaragoza from 1901 until his death, and was elevated to the rank of cardinal in 1919.

Biography
Juan Soldevilla y Romero was born in Fuentelapeña, and studied at the seminaries in Valladolid and Toledo before being ordained to the priesthood on 28 December 1867. He obtained his doctorate in theology from the Central Seminary of Santiago de Compostela in 1868, and then studied canon law at the seminary in Tuy.

Soldevilla served as a curate in three parishes in the Archdiocese of Valladolid, and became secretary to the Archbishop, Cesáreo Rodrigo y Rodríguez (1875), a cathedral canon (1883), and an archpriest (1887). Along with sitting on the Provincial Junta of Beneficence and on the Diocesan Junta for the Reconstruction of Churches, he was the Royal Preacher and a Knight of the Royal American Order of Isabel la Católica, a secretary capitular, and synodal examiner. In 1885, he was a member of the Junta for the assistance of victims of a cholera epidemic.

On 14 February 1889 Soldevilla was appointed Bishop of Tarazona by Pope Leo XIII. He received his episcopal consecration on the following April 28 from Archbishop Benito Sanz y Forés, with Bishops Mariano Alguacil y Fernández and Cesáreo Rodrigo y Rodríguez. Soldevilla was Apostolic Administrator of Tudela from 1889 to 1901, and was promoted to Archbishop of Zaragoza on 16 December 1901.

Pope Benedict XV created him Cardinal Priest of Santa Maria del Popolo in the consistory of 15 December 1919. He received his cardinal's biretta from King Alphonse XIII on Christmas Day of that same year. Soldevilla was one of the cardinal electors who participated in the 1922 papal conclave, which selected Pope Pius XI.

At age 79, Cardinal Soldevilla was assassinated by the anarchist group Los Solidarios in Zaragoza. The apparent motive for the killing was the fact that the Cardinal had been implicated by the anarchists in the hiring and protection of pistoleros who had carried out a campaign of employer-sponsored terrorism against Spanish union members. He is buried at the Basilica of Our Lady of the Pillar.

References

External links
Cardinals of the Holy Roman Church
Catholic-Hierarchy 

1843 births
1923 deaths
20th-century Spanish cardinals
Archbishops of Zaragoza
20th-century Roman Catholic archbishops in Spain
20th-century Roman Catholic martyrs
19th-century Roman Catholic bishops in Spain
Assassinated Spanish people
Assassinated religious leaders
Martyred Roman Catholic priests
Bishops of Tarazona